On 5 February 1992, four bombs exploded in public buildings and on two buses, line 2 and line 30, in Urumqi, Xinjiang, China. The bombings resulted in three deaths and 23 injuries.

Background
Continuing tensions in Xinjiang have been a source of terrorism in China. Conflicts over Uyghur cultural aspirations resurfaced during the 1960s.

External reference
新疆遭遇的暴力恐怖事件(cn) 
新疆曾遭遇暴力恐怖高峰(cn)

See also
Terrorism in China
Xinjiang conflict

1992 murders in China
20th century in Xinjiang
Attacks on buildings and structures in China
Crime in Xinjiang
Explosions in 1992
February 1992 crimes
February 1992 events in Asia 
Improvised explosive device bombings in China
Terrorist incidents in China in 1992
Terrorist incidents on buses in Asia
1992 bombings
Xinjiang conflict
Building bombings in China